Geoff Plitt is an American comedian, satirist, and filmmaker from Los Angeles.

Geoff has a degree from Carnegie Mellon University, worked for Google as an engineer, and studied sketch/improv with The Second City and IO Theater in Chicago. As a performer, he has performed standup around the country, including San Francisco Sketchfest, Windsor Comedy Festival (2nd place winner), San Diego Comedy Fest (semifinalist), Ventura Comedy Fest (semifinalist), Yuk Yuk’s (Vancouver and Toronto), the Hollywood Improv, and the Comedy Store. Geoff acted in an episode on Disney's Hannah Montana playing Jay Leno's nephew, and hosts the popular TikTok satirical news show, What You Need to Know, with 100k+ followers and 30+ million views.

As a filmmaker, Geoff has directed sketches with Sasquatch Comedy and other groups, featuring Dennis Quaid, Tiffany Haddish, and Rachel Bloom. His films have been shown on Fox TV, DirecTV, Comedy Central, NetFlix, Cracked, FunnyOrDie, CollegeHumor, and featured in The Huffington Post. He is also known for writing/directing the viral video Why Weed is Better Than Sex and for guest appearances on podcasts such as Breaking Down Bits.

References

External links
 
 

1981 births
Living people
Television personalities from Los Angeles
American Internet celebrities
Comedians from California
21st-century American comedians